Bahar, Armenia may refer to:
 Arpunk, Armenia - formerly Bahar
 Kakhakn, Armenia - formerly Bahar